Sara Maitland (born 27 February 1950) is a British writer of religious fantasy. A novelist, she is also known for her short stories. Her work has a magic realist tendency.

Life and career
Sarah (later "Sara") Louise Maitland was born in London as the second of six children of Adam Maitland (a descendant of the judge Thomas Maitland, Lord Dundrennan) and Hope Baillie Fraser-Campbell. Adam Maitland's mother, Cecil Louise, was from the Scottish family of Mackenzie of Portmore descending from Colin Mackenzie of Portmore, friend of Walter Scott. Maitland has described her upper-class London family as "very open and noisy". In her childhood she went to school in a small Wiltshire town and attended St Mary's, a girls' boarding school in Calne, from the age of 12 until her admission to university. Maitland thought this school a terrible place and became very excitable.

Growing up, Maitland developed a wild reputation: in 1966 she scandalised one of her brothers by winning a foot race in a very short cotton dress. On entering Oxford University in 1968 to study English, she became friends with future US President Bill Clinton "and a regular visitor at 46 Leckford Road, a house Clinton shared with Frank Aller, Jana (Jan) Brenning and Strobe Talbott". She suffered from problems of mental disarray and inability to carry out routine tasks. During her college years, Maitland was taken to a mental hospital on several occasions for this reason, but she completed her course and soon turned to writing.

Maitland originally became regarded as one of those at the vanguard of the 1970s feminist movement and is often described as a feminist writer.

She has been absorbed in religion since 1972. From 1972 to 1993 she was married to an Anglican priest, but divorced in 1993 and became a Roman Catholic. In 1995, she worked with Stanley Kubrick on the film A.I. Artificial Intelligence.

She has two adult children. Maitland's daughter Polly Lee is an actress best known for her work on the American television series The Americans and Gotham. Maitland's son Adam Lee is a photographer best known for his photographic series Identity Documents and his work with Look - Liverpool International Photography Festival. Since Adam left college, Maitland has moved towards a solitary and prayerful life in a variety of locations, first of all on the Isle of Skye and ultimately in her present house in Galloway. She says today that she wants to avoid most of the comforts of life, especially those that intrude into her quest for silence such as mobile phones, radio, television and even her son. She has described these changes in her life and the experiences leading to them in the autobiographical A Book of Silence. Maitland lectures part-time for Lancaster University's MA in Creative Writing and is a Fellow of St Chad's College, Durham University.

Maitland's 2003 collection of short stories, On Becoming a Fairy Godmother, is a fictional celebration of the menopausal woman, while the title story of 2008's Far North was originally published as "True North" in her first collection Telling Tales and was made into a film of the same title in 2007. The rest of Far North collects dark mythological tales from around the world.

Bibliography

Novels
 Daughter of Jerusalem, 1978 (winner of Somerset Maugham Award 1979)
 also published as The Languages of Love
 Virgin Territory, 1984
 Arky Types, 1987 (with Michelene Wandor)
 Three Times Table, 1991
 Home Truths, 1993
 published as Ancestral Truths in the United States
 Hagiographies, 1998
 Brittle Joys, 1999

Short story collections
 Telling Tales, 1983
 A Book of Spells, 1987
 Women Fly When Men Aren't Watching, 1992
 Angel and Me (for Holy Week), 1996
 On Becoming A Fairy Godmother, Maia, 2003
 Far North & Other Dark Tales, 2008
 Moss Witch, 2013

Non-fiction
 A Map of the New Country: Women and Christianity, 1983
 Vesta Tilley, Virago, 1986
 A Big-Enough God: Artful Theology, Mowbray, 1994
 Virtuous Magic: Women Saints and Their Meanings (with Wendy Mulford), 1998
 Novel Thoughts: Religious Fiction in Contemporary Culture, Erasmus Institute, 1999
 Awesome God: Creation, Commitment and Joy, SPCK, 2002
 The Write Guide (with Martin Goodman), New Writing North, 2007
 Stations of the Cross (with Chris Gollon), 2009
 A Book of Silence, Granta, 2008 (hardcover); 2009 (paperback)
 Gossip from the Forest: the Tangled Roots of our Forests and Fairytales , Granta, 2012
 How to Be Alone, in The School of Life series, Picador, 2014

As editor
 Very Heaven: Looking Back at the 1960s, 1988
 The Rushdie File, 1990 (with Lisa Appignanesi)

Notes

References

External links
 

Orlando Project

1950 births
Alumni of St Anne's College, Oxford
British feminist writers
Converts to Roman Catholicism from Anglicanism
Living people
Roman Catholic writers
British Roman Catholics
British women short story writers
British women novelists
People educated at St Mary's School, Calne
Writers from London
20th-century English novelists
21st-century English writers
20th-century British women writers
21st-century British women writers
20th-century British short story writers
21st-century British short story writers